Hexham Bridge is a road bridge in Northumberland, England linking Hexham with the North Tyne valley. It lies north of the town of Hexham and is the main access to the A69 bypass.

History 
The Tyne was crossed by two ferries called the east and the west boats (Warden Bridge). As a result of persistent agitation, a bridge was started in 1767 and completed in 1770. It was built by Mr Galt and consisted of seven arches. Less than a year later it was swept away in the great Tyne flood of 1771. In that flood, eight bridges shared the fate of Hexham. In 1774 a new attempt was made  to the west by Mr Wooler, an engineer who had been working on the new Newcastle bridge. Piles were sunk to carry the piers but work was abandoned on discovering that the "soil beneath the gravel was a quicksand with no more resistance than chaff".

The authorities next approached John Smeaton, whose name as an engineer was famous. Henry Errington of Sandhoe was given the contract for the sum of £4,700, and work started in 1777. Although the half-completed piers were washed away the following year, work continued and the new bridge was opened to traffic in 1780 [others give 1781]. However, on 10 March 1782, there was a heavy fall of snow followed by a violent hurricane. The valleys of the north and south Tyne were inundated and the nine arches were completely overturned. They are still visible and act as a sort of weir. Robert Mylne, a famous architect and engineer, was called in to report on the feasibility of rebuilding Smeaton's bridge. He was eventually given the contract to build a fourth bridge, and the work was completed in 1793.

It is listed as a Grade II* building by Historic England.

References 

Bridges completed in 1793
Bridges in Northumberland
Crossings of the River Tyne
Grade II* listed buildings in Northumberland
Grade II* listed bridges in England
1793 establishments in England
Hexham